Laurie Venn (born 24 August 1953) is a former Australian racing cyclist. He won the Australian national road race title in 1985.

References

External links

1953 births
Living people
Australian male cyclists
Cyclists from Melbourne